The Al-Hilal Stadium is a multi-use stadium located in Omdurman, Khartoum State, Sudan. It is mostly used for football matches and is also used for athletics. It is the home of Al-Hilal Club and has a capacity of 25,000.

At the opening celebration on Friday, 26 January 1968, Al-Hilal played against the visiting Ghana national football team. The match ended in a 1–1 draw.

References 
AlHilal Official Webpage

Sports venues in Sudan
Football venues in Sudan
Sports venues completed in 1965
Omdurman
Al-Hilal Club (Omdurman)